Hamburger Sport-Verein e.V., commonly known as Hamburger SV or Hamburg, is a German sports club based in Hamburg, with its largest branch being its football section. Though the current HSV was founded in June 1919 from a merger of three earlier clubs, it traces its origins to 29 September 1887 when the first of the predecessors, SC Germania, was founded. Up until the 2017–18 Bundesliga season, which found the team relegated for the first time in history, HSV's football team had the distinction of being the only team that had played continuously in the top tier of the German football league system since the founding of the club at the end of World War I. It was subsequently the only team that had played in every season of the Bundesliga since its foundation in 1963.

HSV has won the German national championship six times, the DFB-Pokal three times and the former League Cup twice. The team's most successful period was from the mid-1970s until the mid-1980s when, in addition to several domestic honours, they won the 1976–77 European Cup Winners' Cup and the 1982–83 European Cup. The outstanding players of this period were Horst Hrubesch, Manfred Kaltz, and Felix Magath, all regulars in the West German National Team. To date, HSV's last major trophy was the 1986–87 DFB-Pokal.

HSV play their home games at the Volksparkstadion in Bahrenfeld, a western district of Hamburg. The club colours are officially blue, white and black but the home kit of the team is white jerseys and red shorts. The team's most common nickname is "die Rothosen" (the Red Shorts). As it is one of Germany's oldest clubs, it is also known as der Dinosaurier (the Dinosaur). HSV have rivalries with Werder Bremen, with whom they contest the Nordderby, and Hamburg-based FC St. Pauli, with whom they contest the Hamburg derby.

HSV is notable in football as a grassroots organisation with youth development a strong theme. The club had a team in the Women's Bundesliga from 2003 to 2012 but it was demoted to Regionalliga level because of financial problems. Other club sections include badminton, baseball, basketball, bowling, boxing, cricket, darts, ice hockey, field hockey, golf, gymnastics, handball, and cardiopulmonary rehabilitation exercises. These sections represent about 10% of the club membership. HSV is one of the biggest sports clubs in Germany with over 84,000 members in all its sections and stated by Forbes to have been among the 20 largest football clubs in the world.

History

Early years
Hamburger Sport-Verein (HSV) traces its origin to the merger of Der Hohenfelder Sportclub and Wandsbek-Marienthaler Sportclub on 29 September 1887 to form Sport-Club Germania Hamburg, usually referred to as SC Germania. This was the first of three clubs that merged on 2 June 1919 to create HSV in its present form. HSV in its club statute recognises the founding of SC Germania as its own date of origin. The other two clubs in the June 1919 merger were Hamburger FC founded in 1888 and FC Falke Eppendorf dating back to 1906. The merger came about because the three clubs had been severely weakened by the impact of the First World War on manpower and finance and they could not continue as separate entities.

SC Germania was formed originally as an athletics club and did not begin to play football until 1891, when some Englishmen joined the club and introduced it. SC Germania had its first success in 1896, winning the Hamburg-Altona championship for the first of five times. Germania player  emigrated to Brazil at the end of the 19th century, where he became an important pioneer of the game, instrumental in the foundation of SC Internacional, the third oldest club of the country which became part of São Paulo FC, one of the major sports clubs of Brazil, in 1938 and SC Germânia of São Paulo, which later became EC Pinheiros.

Hamburger SC 1888 was founded by students on 1 June 1888. It later had links with a youth team called FC Viktoria 95 and, during World War I, was temporarily known as Viktoria Hamburg 88. SC Germania and Hamburger SC 1888 were among 86 clubs who founded the Deutscher Fußball-Bund (DFB; German Football Association) in Leipzig on 28 January 1900. FC Falke was founded by students in Eppendorf on 5 March 1906 but it was never a successful team and played in lower leagues.

The newly formed Hamburger SV quickly became competitive and contested the 1922 national final against 1. FC Nürnberg, who were playing for their third consecutive title. The game was called off on account of darkness after three hours and ten minutes of play, drawn at 2–2. The re-match also went into extra time, and in an era that did not allow for substitutions, that game was called off at 2–2 when Nuremberg were reduced to just seven players (two were injured, two had been sent off) and the referee ruled they could not continue. Considerable wrangling ensued over the decision. The DFB awarded the win to HSV but urged them to refuse the title in the name of good sportsmanship (which they grudgingly did). Ultimately, the Viktoria trophy was not officially presented that year.

HSV's first unqualified success was achieved in the 1923 German football championship when they won the national title against Union Oberschöneweide. They failed to defend the title in 1924, losing the final to Nuremberg, but lifted the Viktoria again in 1928 when they defeated Hertha BSC 5–2 at the Altonaer Stadion in the final.

During the Third Reich, HSV enjoyed local success in the Gauliga Nordmark, also known as the Gauliga Hamburg, winning the league championship in 1937, 1938, 1939, 1941 and 1945. At national level the club was unsuccessful with semi-final losses in 1938 and 1939 their best performances in this period. Its main rival in the Gauliga in those years was Eimsbütteler TV.

Post-war era

HSV's first post-war season was in the newly formed Stadtliga Hamburg and they won its championship in 1946. The club also won the championship of the British occupation zone in 1947 and 1948, the only two seasons this competition was staged.

HSV became the first German team to tour the United States after World War II in May 1950 and came away with a 6–0 record.

Playing in the Oberliga Nord after the resumption of league play in post-war West Germany in 1947, HSV became a frighteningly dominant regional club. In 16 seasons from 1947 to 1948 to 1962–63, they laid claim to the Oberliga title 15 times, only posting an uncharacteristic 11th-place finish in 1953–54. During this period, they scored over 100 goals in each of the 1951, 1955, 1961 and 1962 seasons. In 1953, the club's all-time leading goalscorer Uwe Seeler debuted. In nine seasons, he scored 267 goals in 237 Oberliga matches.

National titles, however, were harder to come by. In 1956, HSV reached the DFB-Pokal final but were beaten by Karlsruher SC. This was followed by losses in the finals of the national championship to Borussia Dortmund in 1957 and Schalke 04 in 1958.

In 1960, HSV became German champions for the first time since 1928, defeating 1. FC Köln 3–2 in the championship final. Seeler, who scored twice in the final, was named West German Footballer of the Year.

As national champions, HSV represented West Germany in the 1960–61 European Cup. The club's first ever match in European competition was a 5–0 defeat of Swiss club Young Boys in Bern, with HSV winning the tie 8–3 on aggregate. In the quarter-finals, they beat English champions Burnley before being defeated by Barcelona at the semi-final stage in a playoff game after the scores were level over two legs. The crowd of 77,600 at the Volksparkstadion for the first leg against Barcelona remains the record attendance for a HSV home match.

Entry into the Bundesliga

Soon after, Germany's first professional football league, the Bundesliga, was formed, with HSV one of 16 clubs invited to join that first season. Hamburger SV was the only original Bundesliga side to have played continuously in the top flight – without ever having been relegated – from when the league was formed in 1963, until they were relegated in the 2017–18 season, finishing in 17th place. They had shared that special status with Eintracht Frankfurt and 1. FC Kaiserslautern until 1996, and with 1. FC Köln until 1998. Altogether, 49 other sides have come and gone since the league's inception. The Bundesliga celebrated its 40th anniversary on 24 August 2004 with a match between "The Dinosaur", as the club has been affectionately nicknamed due to its old age, and Bayern Munich, the league's most successful side.

In August 1963, HSV defeated Borussia Dortmund 3–0 at Hanover's Niedersachsenstadion to win the club's first DFB-Pokal. In the same month, the club played its first ever Bundesliga match, drawing 1–1 with Preußen Münster. HSV finished the Bundesliga's first season in sixth place, with Uwe Seeler scoring 30 goals to secure the Torjägerkanone. He was also named Footballer of the Year for the second time. The DFB-Pokal victory enabled HSV to play in the 1963–64 European Cup Winners' Cup, where they reached the quarter-final, falling to Lyon.

In 1967, HSV again reached the final of the DFB-Pokal where they were defeated 4–0 by Bayern Munich. HSV, however, were admitted to the following season's European Cup Winners' Cup, where they lost to Milan in the final.

In 1970, Seeler was named Footballer of the Year for the third time. He retired at the end of the 1971–72 season in front of 72,000 fans at the Volksparkstadion. He ended his career with 137 goals from 239 Bundesliga matches and 507 goals from 587 appearances in all competitions. In the same season, HSV played in the UEFA Cup for the first time but were knocked out in the first round by Scottish side St Johnstone.

Golden era
In 1973, HSV won the first edition of the DFB-Ligapokal, beating Borussia Mönchengladbach 4–0 in the final. A year later, they reached the DFB-Pokal final, where they were beaten by Eintracht Frankfurt. In 1976, HSV reached another DFB-Pokal final, beating 1. FC Kaiserslautern 2–0 to win the trophy for the second time in the club's history. The following year, HSV achieved its first international success with a 2–0 win over Anderlecht in the final of the 1976–77 European Cup Winners' Cup. The club then signed English superstar Kevin Keegan from European champions Liverpool. After spending much of the previous decade in mid-table, HSV had achieved their best Bundesliga position in 1974–75 by finishing fourth. This was then bettered in 1975–76 with a second-place finish. Keegan's first season at the club saw the team slip to a disappointing tenth place, however, the player himself was named European Footballer of the Year.

In 1978, Branko Zebec was appointed trainer of HSV. The Yugoslav led the club to its first ever Bundesliga title in his first season in charge. Keegan top scored for die Rothosen and was awarded the Ballon d'Or for a second successive year.

In the 1979–80 season, HSV returned to the European Cup for the first time since 1960–61. As had happened 19 years ago, HSV faced Spanish opposition in the semi-finals. After losing the first leg at the Santiago Bernabéu Stadium 2–0, HSV thrashed six-time winners Real Madrid 5–1 at the Volksparkstadion to qualify for the final. HSV returned to Madrid to play Nottingham Forest in the final, where they were beaten 1–0. In the Bundesliga, HSV missed out on defending their title by two points, finishing in second place behind champions Bayern Munich.

In December 1980, HSV dismissed Zebec, who had been struggling with a drinking problem. His assistant Aleksandar Ristić was appointed caretaker for the remainder of the season and secured a creditable second-place finish in the Bundesliga.

In 1981, Austrian coach Ernst Happel was appointed as Zebec's permanent replacement. In his first season, his HSV side regained the Bundesliga title and reached the UEFA Cup final, where they lost 4–0 on aggregate to Sweden's IFK Göteborg.

Between 16 January 1982 and 29 January 1983, HSV went undefeated in the Bundesliga. The run stretched across 36 games and remained a Bundesliga record until November 2013, when it was broken by Bayern Munich.

A third Meisterschale followed at the end of the 1982–83 season, with HSV defending their title against local rivals Werder Bremen on goal difference. The same year, HSV recorded its greatest ever success, defeating Juventus 1–0 in Athens to win the club's first European Cup.

In December 1983, HSV traveled to Tokyo where they faced South American champions Grêmio in the Intercontinental Cup. The Brazilian club took home the trophy with a 93rd minute winning goal. Back home, they lost the league championship to VfB Stuttgart on goal difference.

Both 1984–85 and 1985–86 were disappointing seasons for HSV with the club finishing fifth and seventh respectively. In 1986, midfielder Felix Magath, who had played for the club for ten years and scored the winning goal in the 1983 European Cup Final, retired from professional football.

In 1986–87, HSV finished second in the Bundesliga and won a fourth DFB-Pokal, beating Stuttgarter Kickers 3–1 in the final at West Berlin's Olympiastadion. After this success, Ernst Happel left the club to return to Austria. He remains HSV's most successful trainer with two Bundesliga titles, one DFB-Pokal and one European Cup.

Modern era
In the early 1990s, HSV found itself in financial trouble. The sale of Thomas Doll to Lazio for a then record 16 million Deutsche Marks in June 1991 is credited with ensuring the club's survival. On the pitch, meanwhile, the team was in decline. After a fifth-place finish in 1990–91, HSV finished in the bottom half of the Bundesliga in four consecutive seasons.

In October 1995, Felix Magath returned to HSV to become the club's trainer. The following month, Uwe Seeler also returned as the club president. Under the new regime, HSV finished fifth in the Bundesliga, securing European qualification for the first time in six years. The following season, HSV reached the semi-finals of the DFB-Pokal. In May 1997, however, Magath was fired after a 4–0 defeat to 1. FC Köln with the team one place above the relegation zone. HSV eventually finished in 13th place under reserve team coach Ralf Schehr.

In 1997, HSV appointed Frank Pagelsdorf, who would coach the team for over four years, making him the longest serving trainer since Ernst Happel. A ninth-place finish in 1997–98 was followed by seventh in 1998–99 and third in 1999–2000, the team's best performance since 1986–87.

On 2 September 2000, the new Volksparkstadion was officially opened as the national team played its first 2002 FIFA World Cup qualifier, against Greece.

In 2000–01, HSV competed in the UEFA Champions League for the first time since the competition's expansion from the old European Cup. Their first match was an extraordinary 4–4 draw against Juventus, with Anthony Yeboah scoring the club's first Champions League goal. Though HSV failed to qualify for the second round, they did manage a historic 3–1 win over Juve in the return fixture at the Stadio delle Alpi.

In July 2003, HSV won its first trophy in 16 years with a 4–2 defeat of Borussia Dortmund in the DFB-Ligapokal final.

In August 2004, HSV was upset in the early rounds of the DFB-Pokal by regional league side SC Paderborn. The match became one of the most infamous in recent football history when it was discovered that referee, Robert Hoyzer, had accepted money from a Croatian gambling syndicate to fix the match, which he did, awarding two penalties to Paderborn and sending off HSV player Émile Mpenza. The resulting scandal became the biggest in German football in over 30 years, and was an embarrassment to the country as it prepared to host the 2006 World Cup.

Another third-place finish in 2005–06 saw HSV qualify for the Champions League for the second time. They finished bottom of Group G with a solitary win against Russian club CSKA Moscow. In the league, the team was in 17th place going into the winter break, having won once in the league all season, leading to the dismissal of trainer Thomas Doll. Under new coach Huub Stevens, HSV pulled away from the relegation zone and qualified for the UEFA Cup via a seventh-place finish and victory in the Intertoto Cup. The following season, Stevens led the team to fourth place in the Bundesliga before leaving to take over at Dutch champions PSV Eindhoven. He was replaced by Martin Jol, who took HSV to the semi-finals of both the 2008–09 UEFA Cup and the 2008–09 DFB-Pokal, both of which die Rothosen lost to rivals Werder Bremen. In the league they missed out on Champions League qualification on the final day of the season. In the summer of 2009, after only one season, Jol departed to become coach of Ajax.

Under new coach Bruno Labbadia, HSV reached the semi-finals of the UEFA Cup (now renamed the UEFA Europa League) for the second season in a row. However, a defeat in the away leg to Fulham days after the firing of Labbadia denied the club the opportunity to play in the final, which was held at its home stadium.

On 13 October 2011, Thorsten Fink was appointed as coach with the team in the relegation zone after losing six of their opening eight matches. In HSV's first nine games under Fink they were unbeaten, going into the winter break in 13th place. The team eventually finished 15th, avoiding a first ever relegation by five points. In 2012–13, HSV recorded a much improved seventh-place finish, in large part due to Heung-min Son's ability to score crucial goals. During the season, however, the team equaled the club's record Bundesliga defeat, losing 9–2 at the Allianz Arena to Bayern Munich.

Fink was replaced on 25 September 2013 by Bert van Marwijk, who in the same season was replaced by Mirko Slomka on 17 February 2014. Under Slomka, the club narrowly avoided its first ever relegation from the Bundesliga in May 2014 by defeating Greuther Fürth on the away goals rule in a play-off.

Eventually in the next season Hamburg once again changed managers due to a poor start of the season firing Slomka on 15 September. His successor Josef Zinnbauer held the job up until 22 March and was replaced by interim coach Peter Knäbel. who was eventually replaced by returning Bruno Labbadia who saved the club at the end of the season in the relegation play-off for the second year running against Karlsruher SC. Labbadia achieved only two points in the first ten games of the 2016–17 season and was replaced by Markus Gisdol who had a shaky start but managed to get 20 points in 9 games from the 19th match day to the 28th match day. On the last match day, Hamburg avoided the relegation play-offs and stayed in the Bundesliga.

Relegation and missed promotions
In the 2017–18 Bundesliga, after a 3–1 defeat in the first round of DFB-Pokal against the third-division team VfL Osnabrück, HSV managed at least in the Bundesliga a positive start of the season with two wins against FC Augsburg and 1. FC Köln. However, eight games followed without a single win. At the end of the first half of the season, HSV was in second last place in the table. After two defeats in the first two games of the second half, coach Markus Gisdol was dismissed. HSV hired Bernd Hollerbach, a former player of the club, as a new coach. After seven games without a win and a 6–0 defeat against FC Bayern Munich, he was also dismissed. A few days before the game against Bayern, the club announced the dismissal of CEO Heribert Bruchhagen. Frank Wettstein, CFO of the club, has been appointed as the new CEO. On the day of his appointment, he dismissed the sports director Jens Todt. The club hired former successful HSV player Thomas von Heesen as a sports consultant until the end of season. He should take over a part of the duties for the dismissed Jens Todt. For the last eight games in the 2017–18 Bundesliga, the club promoted the coach of Hamburger SV II: Christian Titz. Until then, he was very successful in the Regionalliga Nord (fourth league) and was with his team at the top of the table. With four wins and an offensively minded style of play, the coach convinced the club and received a two-year contract.

After the disastrous season in the 2017–18 Bundesliga under three different coaches, a final day win over Borussia Mönchengladbach was not enough to escape relegation after Wolfsburg won against Köln 4–1. They were relegated to the 2. Bundesliga for the first time in the Bundesliga's 55-year history, causing riots by Hamburg supporters.

After the relegation Christian Titz was sacked in October 2018, and replaced by Hannes Wolf. Hamburg failed to gain a seat back to the Bundesliga and failed to reach the playoffs with a one-point difference between them and Union Berlin. The team managed to reach the semi-finals of the 2018–19 DFB-Pokal, before being defeated by RB Leipzig 1–3 at home.

For the 2019–20 2. Bundesliga, their second year in the 2. Bundesliga, Wolf was laid-off and was replaced by Dieter Hecking. Again they failed to return to 1. Bundesliga by a one-point difference, and they were eliminated in the second round of the 2019–20 DFB Pokal by Vfb Stuttgart 1–2 in extra time.

By again missing the promotion, Hecking's contract was not extended. For the 2020–21 season, Daniel Thioune was brought in as the new head coach from league rivals VfL Osnabrück. In the summer transfer window, various players left the club at the end of their loan or contract, but most of them were not part of the regular staff. Most notably, the club signed Simon Terodde, Moritz Heyer, Toni Leistner and Sven Ulreich to bolster the team with experienced players. In addition, Tim Leibold became the new team captain as the successor to Aaron Hunt. The season began with a 1–4 first-round knockout loss in the DFB-Pokal to 3. Liga club Dynamo Dresden. Despite this disappointing loss, HSV then started the season well and won the first 5 games. After a subsequent winless streak of 5 games, 3 of which were lost in a row, the team stabilised again from matchday 11 and went undefeated until the winter break. The first half of the season, which ended in January due to the late start of the season, ended with 36 points as HSV were first in the league table. In the second half of the season, HSV collapsed as in the two previous years. From matchday 20 and onwards, HSV were again winless for 5 games. After 2 wins, another winless series of 5 games followed from matchday 27 and onwards, during which, among other things, the club gave up a 3–0 lead against Hannover 96 which ended in a 3–3 draw. The club also lost to firm relegation candidates SV Sandhausen. Due to this development, Thioune was released at the beginning of May 2021 and replaced by the head of academy Horst Hrubesch for the final three games of the season. At that point, HSV were in third place with 52 points, five points from a spot guaranteeing direct promotion.

In the 2021–22 season, HSV finally managed to reach the elusive promotion playoff spot, finishing third on goal difference over Darmstadt 98. Once again, however, the season ended in heartbreak as HSV fell to the 1. Bundesliga 16th place side Hertha Berlin 1–2 in the playoff, slumping to a 0–2 home defeat despite winning the first leg in Berlin.

Stadium

Hamburger SV plays its home games in the Volksparkstadion, which was previously known as the Imtech Arena between 2010 and 2015. Built on the site of the original Volksparkstadion, opened in 1953, the current stadium was opened in 2000, and has a capacity of 57,000 – approximately 47,000 seats with another 10,000 spectators standing. The first Volksparkstadion had been a venue for the 1974 World Cup and UEFA Euro 1988. The Volksparkstadion is a UEFA category one stadium, which certifies it to host UEFA Europa League and UEFA Champions League finals. The stadium was the site of four group matches and a quarter-final in the past 2006 World Cup, hosted by Germany, and was known as FIFA World Cup Stadium Hamburg during the event. It was also the venue for the 2010 UEFA Europa League Final.

HSV fans can be buried at a dedicated graveyard near the home stadium, covered in turf from the original Hamburg pitch.

Rivals and affinities

HSV contests the Nordderby with fellow Northern Germany side Werder Bremen. In Spring 2009, HSV faced Werder four times in only three weeks, and Werder defeated HSV in the UEFA-Cup semi-final, as well as in the DFB-Pokal semi-final. Many HSV fans see this as the origin of the club's decline from 2009 to the relegation year 2018.

Furthermore, HSV shares a cross-town rivalry with FC St. Pauli. When, after seven years in different leagues, the game HSV against FC St. Pauli came back again, there were already several weeks before the game disputes of both fan groups. It started when about 100 HSV fans interrupt a St. Pauli concert because it took place on the "HSV-side" of the Reeperbahn. In a league game a short time later, the HSV fans showed a banner in the stadium with the inscription "Stellt euch endlich unsrer Gier – 100 Ihr : 100 Wir" ("Finally satisfy our lust – 100 of you vs. 100 of us"). After fans of FC St. Pauli attacked HSV fans working on a choreography for the game and destroyed parts of it, some HSV fans threatened them by hanging figures in the colours of the rival at several bridges throughout the city. In addition, one day later there was a march of about 80 HSV-Ultras across the Reeperbahn, where insulting chants against St. Pauli were screamed. In the hours leading up to first 2. Bundesliga Hamburg Derby on 10 March 2019 at the Millerntor-Stadion, the supporters groups of both teams were escorted by the Hamburg police to avoid conflict. The day proved historic with a triumphant 4–0 win over FC St. Pauli at the Millerntor-Stadion, the first time HSV had won at the stadium in the St. Pauli quarter since 1962. In response to Benedikt Pliquett's celebratory kick of HSV's corner flag at the Volksparkstadion in 2011, Tom Mickel mimicked Pliquett with a "Kung-Fu Kick" of his own, according to MOPO.

Besides, after two major conflicts between the two fan groups the relationship with Holstein Kiel has been considered as difficult for a short time now.

HSV have an affinity with Scottish club Rangers. HSV fans unfurl their club logo at Rangers' away European matches. The link between Rangers and Hamburg dates back to 1977 when the Hamburg Rangers Supporters' Club was set up by HSV fans who had visited Rangers matches before and were thrilled by the atmosphere at Ibrox. The links were further strengthened when Rangers signed Jörg Albertz from Hamburg. In the derby against St. Pauli in the season 2018–19 about 200–300 fans of the Scottish club traveled to Hamburg to support HSV. The friendship between Celtic and Hamburg's rivals FC St. Pauli has no influence on this friendship, however. Nevertheless, the HSV fans sent a provocation towards Celtic, when they clashed in the Europa League in 2009. They showed a Union Jack, bearing the words "No Surrender", as a big choreography in the stadium.

HSV have a friendship bond with Hannover 96 due to both being known by the abbreviation "HSV". Their meetings involve the visitors' club song to be played, and fans chanting HSV from each end of the stadium.

Furthermore, Hamburger SV has a friendship bond with Arminia Bielefeld – both teams share the same colors, resulting in the popular fan chant "Schwarz, weiß, blau – Arminia und der HSV" ("Black, white, blue – Arminia and the HSV"). Especially in the 1990s, multiple players transferred between the two clubs.

As Hannover and Bielefeld fans have affinities as well, all three clubs are sometimes called the Nordallianz (Northern Alliance) despite the fact that the city of Bielefeld is not technically located in Northern Germany.

In addition, some fan groups maintain good contacts with the fourth division team VfB Lübeck, whose fans also have an aversion to St. Pauli and Holstein Kiel. In 2013, HSV helped the club, which was threatened by insolvency, with a free friendly match, in which the team competed with several national players to attract as many spectators as possible and left the entire earnings for VfB Lübeck.

Fans 
The Hamburger SV has a big fanbase in Hamburg and the region. The band Abschlach! has written the HSV anthem Mein Hamburg lieb ich sehr. The band always plays this song before HSV games.

HSV has more than 700 officially registered fan clubs in Germany and abroad. Significant ones include "Rautengeil Fallingbostel", "Hermanns Treue Riege", "Totale Offensive e. V." and the "Wilhelmsburg Boys". Well-known HSV ultra groups are or were "Poptown" and "Chosen Few". The "Rothosen" supporters' association founded in April 1972 is the oldest HSV fan club. It still has around 40 members and was one of the more well-known fan clubs in the 1980s. The business fan club of Hamburger SV was registered by HSV as an official fan club in 2006. This fan club was founded by entrepreneurs and combines sporting interests with business interests. Since the 2006–07 season, the Hamburger Sport-Verein has had a fan club for gay and bisexual fans called "BLUE PRIDE", which merged into the "Volksparkjunxx" in January 2012. The members of fan club "Die Löwen" has been notorious for their aggressiveness. The group was associated with skinheads and right-wing radicalism in the 1980s. The Bremen fan Adrian Maleika was murdered by members of the group on 16 October 1982.

As a reaction to the murder of Maleika, the HSV fan project was founded, which still exists today and is financially supported by the German Football League and the Hamburg Authority for Labour, Social Affairs, Family and Integration. The fan project makes travel offers for away games and supports the Supporters Club with its offers. Numerous events take place in the fan house, also with the support of HSV itself.

The Supporters Club, founded in 1993, has now been joined by 66,489 fans (as of 1 June 2019), who have thus also become members of HSV. The 36 founding members include the former board member responsible for membership matters, Oliver Scheel, the former supervisory board members Henning Trolsen and Christian Reichert, and the current director of the HSV Museum, Dirk Mansen.

As a reaction to the spin-off, disappointed fans founded the "HFC Falke" – based on the model of FC United of Manchester – which started playing in the 2015–16 season and is currently playing in the Hamburg district league north.

Club kit and colours
The club colours are officially blue, white and black according to its statute but the fans use the combination "schwarz-weiss-blau" (black-white-blue) in their songs and chants; they also chant "HSV" . The club crest is a black and white diamond on a blue background. These were the colours of SC Germania. The use of the blue background suggests a link with Hamburg's maritime tradition as the Blue Peter flag signal (meaning "All Aboard" or "Outward Bound") is a white rectangle on a similar blue background.

In contrast, the team's home kit is white jerseys and red shorts, which are the colours of the Free and Hanseatic City of Hamburg. As a result, the team's most common nickname is "die Rothosen" (the Red Shorts). Because of its age and having been ever-present in the top flight of German football, HSV is also known as der Dinosaurier (the Dinosaur) and currently uses a dinosaur mascot called "Hermann" (named after long-time club physiotherapist Hermann Rieger) for marketing purposes.

HSV's kit was made by Adidas from 1978 to 1995 and the club re-engaged Adidas in 2007 having worked with a number of its competitors in the meantime. The first shirt sponsorship was introduced in 1974. The shirt now carries the Orthomol logo. The following is a list of shirt sponsors by date:

Sponsor

Kit Sponsor

In international competitions
HSV's first participation in European competition came after they won the German championship in 1960 and were invited to take part in the 1960–61 European Cup. They had a bye in the preliminary round and their first round opponents were Young Boys. HSV won the two-legged tie 8–3 on aggregate, beating the Swiss side 0–5 in the away leg on 2 November 1960 and then drawing 3–3 at home on 27 November.

HSV reached the semi-final of the European Cup in 1961. Subsequently, they have twice played in the final, losing 1–0 to Nottingham Forest in 1980 and defeating Juventus 1–0 in 1983. With Borussia Dortmund and Bayern Munich, HSV is one of three German teams who have won the European Cup. HSV won the UEFA Cup Winners' Cup in 1976–77 and have been runners-ups in both that competition and the UEFA Cup. Their most recent European campaign was the 2009–10 UEFA Europa League in which they reached the semi-final.

Hamburg became, in 1982, the first club in European football to have been runner-up in all three major UEFA club competitions, having lost the 1967–68 European Cup Winners' Cup, the 1979–80 European Cup and the 1981–82 UEFA Cup finals. Additionally, having lost the European Super Cup for the first time in the 1977 edition, the 1983 Intercontinental Cup and in the 1999 UEFA Intertoto Cup, they became the first and only club in Europe to have obtained the silver medal in all six confederation competitions.

HSV's biggest win in a European match occurred on 23 October 1974 when they defeated Romanian team Brașov 8–0 in a UEFA Cup second round tie. Their biggest defeat was in the second leg of the 1977 Super Cup when they lost 6–0 to Liverpool at Anfield on 6 December. Manfred Kaltz with 81 has made the most appearances for HSV in Europe and Horst Hrubesch with 20 is their leading goalscorer.

Based on data published by UEFA, a summary of HSV's European record to the end of the 2021–22 season is as follows:

According to UEFA, HSV is currently unranked among European clubs. The last year that the club had a coefficient was in 2014 when it ranked 64th (34.328).

Honours

HSV have the record in German football of having won the most regional titles, having won 31 regional titles. However, the regional titles do not count as a trophy or even as a title itself. Winning a regional title only guaranteed a club to battle, with other regional winning clubs, for the German Championship.

Hamburg's three Bundesliga championships entitle the club to display one gold star of the "Verdiente Meistervereine". Under the current award system, their pre-Bundesliga championships are not recognized and so they are not entitled to the second star of a five-time champion.

After the replay of the championship final in 1922 had to be abandoned due to the opponents no longer having enough players on the ground, the German Football Association (DFB) requested HSV to renounce the title, which the club did.

During his first season with Hamburger SV (2000–01), Sergej Barbarez became the top scorer for his club with 22 goals and joint top scorer of the Bundesliga with Ebbe Sand.

Until the 2017–18 season, HSV took pride in its status as the only club to have played continuously in the Bundesliga since its foundation. A large clock in the northwest corner of the Volksparkstadion marked the time, down to the second, since the league was founded on 24 August 1963.

Domestic
German Champions:
Winners: 1922–23, 1927–28, 1959–60, 1978–79, 1981–82, 1982–83
Runners-up: 1923–24, 1956–57, 1957–58, 1975–76, 1979–80, 1980–81, 1983–84, 1986–87
DFB-Pokal:
Winners: 1962–63, 1975–76, 1986–87
Runners-up: 1955–56, 1966–67, 1973–74

DFB-Ligapokal:
Winners: 1972–73, 2003

DFB-Supercup:
Runners-up: 1977, 1983, 1987

European
European Cup:
Winners: 1982–83
Runners-up: 1979–80
European Cup Winners' Cup:
Winners: 1976–77
Runners-up: 1967–68
UEFA Cup:
Runners-up: 1981–82
UEFA Super Cup:
Runners-up: 1977, 1983
UEFA Intertoto Cup:
Winners: 2005, 2007 (Outright Winners)
Runners-up: 1999
 Intertoto Cup:
Group Winners: 1970, 1994

Worldwide
Intercontinental Cup
Runners-up: 1983

Double
1982–83: League and European Cup

Regional
Northern German football championship (unrecognized)
Winners (10): 1921, 1922, 1923, 1924, 1925, 1928, 1929, 1931, 1932, 1933 (record)
Oberliga Nord (unrecognized)
Winners (15): 1948, 1949, 1950, 1951, 1952, 1953, 1955, 1956, 1957, 1958, 1959, 1960, 1961, 1962, 1963 (record)
Gauliga Nordmark (unrecognized)
Winners: 1937, 1938, 1939, 1941
Gauliga Hamburg
Winners: 1945
Stadtliga Hamburg
Winners: 1946
British occupation zone championship
Winners: 1947, 1948 (record)

Players

Current squad

Out on loan

Personnel

Head coaches since 1963

* Served as caretaker coach.

Notable players

Other sections

HSV-Panthers (Futsal) 

The Futsal section of Hamburger SV competes under the name "HSV Panthers", which emerged from the Hamburg Panthers. They play in the highest german Futsal division, the Futsal Bundesliga.

The team is a founding member of the Futsal Bundesliga of the German Football Association. So far, the team has won the Deutsche Futsal Meisterschaft four times and is therefore German record champion. The HSV Panthers were also represented four times internationally in the UEFA Futsal Champions League, in 2015 they were the first German team to qualify for the elite round. With Michael Meyer, Onur Saglam, Dennis Oztürk, Sid Ziskin, Nico Zankl, and Ian-Prescott Claus, six German futsal national players play in the ranks of Hamburger SV.

Hamburger SV II

The reserve team serves mainly as the final stepping stone for promising young players before being promoted to the main team.

Women's football

The women's section was created in 1970. The team played in the Bundesliga between 2003 and 2012.

Other sports
The club's rugby section was established in 1925 but ceased operation in the 1990s. It was re-established in March 2006. The club's men's baseball section, HSV Hamburg, known as the Stealers, was established in 1985 and plays in the first division of the Baseball Bundesliga. Other important sections are volleyball and cricket. Okka Rau was qualified for the 2008 Beijing Olympics of volleyball. HSV Cricket plays in the league of the North German Cricket Federation (Norddeutscher Cricket Verband) and won several first places.

References

External links

Team statistics
Hamburger SV formations at football-lineups
Statistics, formations and historical data at worldfootball.net

 
Football clubs in Hamburg
Football clubs in Germany
Multi-sport clubs in Germany
Association football clubs established in 1887
Baseball teams in Germany
1887 establishments in Germany
UEFA Champions League winning clubs
UEFA Cup Winners' Cup winning clubs
UEFA Intertoto Cup winning clubs
Bundesliga clubs
2. Bundesliga clubs